Skelton may refer to:

Places

United Kingdom
Skelton, Cumbria, England
Skelton Transmitting Station, a radio transmitter and the tallest structure in the UK
Skelton, East Riding of Yorkshire, England
North Yorkshire, England
Skelton, Richmondshire
Skelton-on-Ure,  Harrogate
Skelton, York
Skelton and Brotton, parish in Redcar and Cleveland
Skelton-in-Cleveland
 Skelton Castle
North Skelton

United States
Skelton, Indiana
Skelton Township, Warrick County, Indiana
Skelton Township, Carlton County, Minnesota
Skelton, West Virginia

People

Surname
Aaron Skelton (born 1974)
Arvonne Fraser (née Skelton; 1925–2018), American women's rights activist
Aylmer Skelton (1884–1959)
B. R. Skelton (born 1933)
Barbara Skelton (1916–1996)
Betty Skelton Erde (1926–2011), women's land speed record holder and aviator
Bevil Skelton (1641–1696)
Bill Skelton (1920–2003)
Byron George Skelton (1905–2004)
Cameron Skelton (born 1995), rugby player
Carol Skelton (born 1945)
Charles Skelton (1806–1879), American politician
Charlie Skelton, English comedy writer
Craig Skelton (born 1980)
Dudley Skelton (1878–1962)
Gavin Skelton (born 1981)
Geoffrey Skelton (1916–1998)
George Skelton (1919–1994)
Harry Skelton (born 1990), British jockey
Helen Skelton (born 1983), British television presenter
Henrietta Skelton (1839/1842–1900), German-born Canadian-American social reformer, writer, organizer, lecturer
Ike Skelton (1931–2013), American congressman
John Skelton (c.1460–1529), English poet
John Skelton (American football) (born 1988), American football quarterback
Joseph John Skelton (1783–1871)
Karen Skelton (born 1961)
Katie Skelton (born 1987)
Keith Skelton (1918–1995)
Kenneth Skelton (1918–2003)
Louise Skelton, equestrian athlete
Matt Skelton (born 1967), boxer
Matthew Skelton, writer
Melissa M. Skelton (born 1951)
Nellie Bangs Skelton (1855-1911)
Nick Skelton (Nicholas David Skelton, born 1957), British show jumper
Noel Skelton (1880–1935), Scottish British MP
Oscar D. Skelton (1878–1941)
Owen Ray Skelton (1886–1969)
Peter Skelton (1934–2009)
Philip Skelton (1707–1787)
Raleigh Ashlin Skelton (1906–1970), cartographer
Red Skelton (1913–1997), comedian
Reginald Skelton (1872–1956), polar explorer
Rich Skelton (born 1966)
Robert Skelton (1896–1973)
Roy Skelton (1931–2011), actor
Samuel Skelton (died 1634), first pastor of the First Church in Salem, Massachusetts
Sean Skelton (born 1971)
Simon Skelton (born 1972), English lawn bowler
Sophie Skelton (born 1994), English actress
Stuart Skelton (born 1968)
Thomas R. Skelton (1928–1994)
Will Skelton (born 1992), Australian rugby player
William de Skelton, English medieval college fellow and university chancellor
Walter Skelton (1883–1979)
William Skelton (1763–1848)

Given name
Skelton Knaggs (1911–1955), English actor

See also
Shelton (disambiguation), a sixteenth-century alternate spelling
Mary Shelton (1510s–1570s), mistress of Henry VIII of England and maid-of-honour to his wife and her cousin, Anne Boleyn
Anne Shelton (courtier) (1475–1555), mother of Mary Shelton, head of the household of the future Elizabeth I and aunt of Anne Boleyn
Sir John Shelton (1470s–1539), head of the household of the future Elizabeth I and father of Mary Shelton
Skeleton (disambiguation)
 Skilton, a surname derived from Skelton

English-language surnames